Johann Mayer (April 2, 1886 – December 29, 1923), nicknamed Stumpfarm, was a German serial killer, who was sentenced to death for fourfold murder and one manslaughter.

Life 
Mayer was born in Uersfeld, the son of Gunderath-born non-sedentary day laborer Johann Wilhelm Mayer and his wife Anna Maria (née Knorr). The place of birth in which Mayer was first baptized on his birthday and regularly baptized the next day, was rather coincidental, as his traveling parents did not have a permanent home. As a child Mayer attended the school in Boos, before he started work in a quarry. Due to an accident in the quarry - possibly through careless handling - Mayer lost his left forearm, which earned him the nickname "Stumpfarm", even before his criminal career began. Since then he was only partially able to work as a farmhand and harvest helper.

At the time of the First World War, Mayer, who was incapable of military service, increasingly fell into an unsteady lifestyle. He only did her murder in the woods between Elzbach and Endert, but was also given penalties for assault, theft and poaching.

Crimes 
From March 1918 to May 1919, Mayer killed three women with whom he had previous relationships, as well as two men, with whom he had previously been friends.

 Maria Dahm from Mayen, 23 years old, murdered between March 18–24, 1918 in the Mayen town forest.
 Maria Falk from Bonn, 28 years old, murdered in February 1919 in the forest between Masburg and Hauroth.
 Nikolaus Schüller from Kalenborn, 30 years old, murdered on March 30, 1919, in the forest near Mannebach.
 Lorenz Reuter from Masburg, 22 years old, murdered on April 26, 1919, in the forest district of Etscheid between Boos and Mannebach.
 Katharina Forst from Mannebach-Sickerath, 34 years old widow with three children, who disappeared in May 1919 and whose body was found more than a year later in the forest near Illerich.

As a murder weapon Mayer used a carbine, and in later interrogations, he described the crimes with "A shot, a scream, all over." To disguise his actions, he separated the heads and limbs of his male victims and exchanged them.

The well-known "Stumpfarm" was investigated on July 9, 1919, but remained undetected working as a farmhand in Eulgem. However, on August 10, 1922, he was recognized and accosted by vagrants in the Sänger district northwest of the village. The prisoner was first detained in Kaisersesch, then moved to Koblenz.

Condemnation 
Since Johann Mayer did not confess before the Koblenz jury court, he was sentenced to death on February 7, 1923, for fourfold murder and because of the one manslaughter - 15 years imprisonment. A confession was filed by "Stumpfarm" shortly before his execution, after mercy petitions were rejected. The death sentence against Mayer was enforced on December 29, 1923, in the courtyard of the Cologne prison, where he was decapitated by the guillotine.

See also
 List of German serial killers

Literature 

 „Stumpfarm“ left a bloody trail, Trierischer Volksfreund No. 221 from 21./22. September 1996.
 Helmut Müller: The Stumpfarm – a poacher, stray and murderer. From the life of Eifel Schinderhannes. Plaidt 2008, .

External links 

 Heimatjahrbuch Vulkaneifel 1979: Franz Josef Ferber: The Stumpfarm – a stray, poacher and murderer, From the life of the "Eifel Schinderhannes"
 www.doppelmaar.de Franz Josef Ferber: From the life of "Eifel Schinderhannes", a former student from Boos

References 

1886 births
1923 deaths
1918 murders in Germany 
1919 murders in Germany
Criminals from Rhineland-Palatinate
German people convicted of manslaughter
Executed German serial killers
Male serial killers
People convicted of murder by Germany
People executed by the Weimar Republic by guillotine